Nõmme railway station (first name in German Haltestelle auf der 7. Werst and in Russian Oстановочный пункт на 7. версте, after 1874 in German Nömme and Russian Неммe) is a railway station in Nõmme, Tallinn, Estonia. The station serves the Nõmme sub-district which has approximately 6600 residents.

The Nõmme railway station is located approximately 8 kilometers (5 mi) southwest from the Baltic station (Estonian: Balti jaam) which is the main railway station of Tallinn, near the Baltic Sea. The station was opened in 1872, and the station building was completed in 1905. There are two platforms along the two-track railway, one 137 and other 142 meters long.

History 
Although the Tallinn-Paldiski railway opened already in 1870, a station on this site was not opened before 1872. The station building was completed in 1905.

Operations 

Elron's electric trains from Tallinn to Keila, Turba and Klooga-Rand stop at Nõmme station. In 2020, there were approximately 58 train departures per day at Nõmme railway station towards Tallinn city center. The station belongs to the Zone I, within which traffic is free for Tallinners. There is a possibility to transfer to TLT (Tallinn City Transport) bus lines 10, 27 and 33 at a bus station on Pärnu maantee and Turu plats and to bus line 36 at a bus station on Pärnu maantee. All bus stations are about a 5-minute walk from the Nõmme railway station.

Architecture 

In 1905 the first wooden station building was completed. The station's awning was completed in 1912 but was fully demolished in 1987 during the Soviet occupation. The awning was rebuilt historically accurately in 1999.

Historical Photos of the Nõmme Railway Station

See also
 List of railway stations in Estonia
 Rail transport in Estonia

References

External links

 Official website of Eesti Raudtee (EVR) – the national railway infrastructure company of Estonia  responsible for maintenance and traffic control of most of the Estonian railway network
 Official website of Elron – the national passenger train operating company of Estonia responsible for all domestic passenger train services in Estonia

Railway stations in Estonia
Buildings and structures in Tallinn
Transport in Tallinn
Railway stations opened in 1872